V 107 Botilla Russ was a German cargo ship which was converted into a Vorpostenboot and then a Sperrbrecher for the Kriegsmarine during World War II.

Description
The engine was built by Atlas Werke, Bremen.

History
Botilla Russ was built in 1922 by Atlas Werke for Ernst Russ, Hamburg, Germany. The Code Letters RCQF were allocated. In 1934, her Code Letters were changed to DHCY.

On 1 October 1939, Bottila Russs was requisitioned by the Kriegsmarine. She served with 1 Vorpostenflotille as V 107 Botilla Russ. On 22 June 1940, she was transferred to 3 Sperrbrecherflotille as Sperrbrecher 137. She struck a mine and sank off the coast of Finistère, France on 28 January 1944.

References 

1922 ships
Ships built in Hamburg
Steamships of Germany
Merchant ships of Germany
World War II merchant ships of Germany
Auxiliary ships of the Kriegsmarine
Maritime incidents in January 1944